Longbai Xincun is a station on the branch line of Line 10 of the Shanghai Metro, serving nearby neighbourhood of Longbai Xincun. It is connected by bus lines 721, 804, Minhang #18, Hongqiao Town #2, Hongqiao Hub #1, as well as routes 57, 753, 809 and 867 nearby.

References 

Railway stations in Shanghai
Line 10, Shanghai Metro
Railway stations in China opened in 2010
Shanghai Metro stations in Minhang District